Scopula fragilis is a moth of the family Geometridae. It was described by Warren in 1903. It is endemic to Kenya.

References

Endemic moths of Kenya
Moths described in 1903
fragilis
Moths of Africa
Endemic fauna of Kenya
Taxa named by William Warren (entomologist)